Dictyanthus is a genus of plant in family Apocynaceae, first described as a genus in 1844. It is native to Mexico and Central America

Species

formerly included
moved to Matelea 
Dictyanthus reticulatus (Engelm. ex A.Gray) Benth. & Hook.f. ex Hemsl., synonym of Matelea reticulata (Engelm. ex A.Gray) Woodson

References

Apocynaceae genera
Asclepiadoideae